Hinds County Courthouse in Raymond, Mississippi, also known as Raymond Courthouse, was built in 1857. It was listed on the National Register of Historic Places in 1986.

References

Courthouses on the National Register of Historic Places in Mississippi
Government buildings completed in 1857
County courthouses in Mississippi
Scotch-Irish American history
National Register of Historic Places in Hinds County, Mississippi
1857 establishments in Mississippi